Leila Cássia dos Santos Silva (born 23 October 1996) is a Brazilian rugby sevens player. She competed in the 2020 Summer Olympics. She represented Brazil at the 2022 Rugby World Cup Sevens in Cape Town, they placed eleventh overall.

References

1996 births
Living people
Sportspeople from São Paulo
Rugby sevens at the 2020 Summer Olympics
Brazilian rugby sevens players
Olympic rugby sevens players of Brazil
Rugby sevens players at the 2020 Summer Olympics
Brazil international women's rugby sevens players
Brazilian female rugby union players